David A. Miller was the 32nd mayor of Lubbock, Texas from 2006-2008. A member of the Republican Party, Miller is considered one of Lubbock's most conservative mayors.

References

1948 births
Living people
Mayors of Lubbock, Texas